EasyJet Europe Airline GmbH, trading as easyJet, is a European low-cost airline founded in 2017 and based in Vienna, Austria. It operates scheduled flights across Europe and is a subsidiary of EasyJet plc.

History

The airline was established on 18 July 2017 and started operations on 20 July 2017, with the first flight being an Airbus A320 (re-registered as OE-IVA, previously G-EZPA) flying from London Luton Airport to Vienna International Airport. The airline was established following the UK referendum vote to leave the European Union and the airline's decision to obtain an Air Operator's Certificate (AOC) in another EU member state in order to continue operating flights across and within European countries after the UK leaves the EU.

Many aircraft currently registered to EasyJet UK will be reregistered to EasyJet Europe, and those staff employed by EasyJet UK but based elsewhere in the European Union will be transferred to EasyJet Europe. EasyJet has announced that it is planning to re-register 110 aircraft to fly under the new AOC of EasyJet Europe by March 2019.

EasyJet is thus a pan-European airline group with three airlines based in the UK, Austria and Switzerland (EasyJet UK, EasyJet Europe, and EasyJet Switzerland), all owned or part-owned by EasyJet plc, based in the UK and listed on the London Stock Exchange.

On 30 March 2019, flights became operated by EasyJet Europe under their own flight numbers and callsign.

Destinations

EasyJet Europe operates in conjunction with the other EasyJet-branded airlines.

Fleet
, EasyJet Europe operates the following aircraft:

References

External links

Airlines of Austria
Airlines established in 2017
EasyGroup
Low-cost carriers
Austrian companies established in 2017